Lishan District is a district of Anshan City, Liaoning, People's Republic of China.

Administrative divisions
There are eight subdistricts and one town.

Subdistricts:
 Lishan Subdistrict
Youhao Subdistrict
Shuangshan District
Shuguang Subdistrict
Lingshan Subdistrict
Shenbei Subdistrict
Shennan Subdistrict
Shahe Subdistrict

The only town is Shahe

References

External links

County-level divisions of Liaoning
Anshan